ESMO may refer to:

 European Society for Medical Oncology
 European Student Moon Orbiter
 Oskarshamn Airport (ICAO code)